The 1996–97 season was Clydebank's thirty-first season in the Scottish Football League. They competed in the Scottish First Division where they finished 9th and relegated to the Scottish Second Division. They also competed in the Scottish League Cup, Scottish Challenge Cup and Scottish Cup.

Results

Division 1

Final League table

Scottish League Cup

Scottish Challenge Cup

Scottish Cup

References

 

Clydebank
Clydebank F.C. (1965) seasons